Shabanova Gora is a rural locality (a village) in Voskresenskoye Rural Settlement, Cherepovetsky District, Vologda Oblast, Russia. The population was 36 as of 2002.

Geography 
Shabanova Gora is located 41 km north of Cherepovets (the district's administrative centre) by road. Gorka is the nearest rural locality.

References 

Rural localities in Cherepovetsky District